Rio Bravo is a 1959 American Western film directed and produced by Howard Hawks and starring John Wayne, Dean Martin, Ricky Nelson, Angie Dickinson, Walter Brennan, and Ward Bond. Written by Jules Furthman and Leigh Brackett, based on the short story "Rio Bravo" by B. H. McCampbell, the film stars Wayne as a Texan sheriff who arrests the brother of a powerful local rancher for murder and then has to hold the man in jail until a U.S. Marshal can arrive. With the help of a cripple, a drunk and a young gunfighter, they hold off the rancher's gang. Rio Bravo was filmed on location at Old Tucson Studios outside Tucson, Arizona, in Technicolor.

In 2014, Rio Bravo was deemed "culturally, historically, or aesthetically significant" by the Library of Congress and selected for preservation in the National Film Registry.

Plot

Joe Burdette, the spoiled younger brother of wealthy land baron Nathan Burdette, taunts town drunk Dude by tossing money into a spittoon. The sheriff, John T. Chance, stops Dude from reaching into the spittoon, prompting Dude to lash out and knock Chance unconscious. Joe starts to beat Dude for fun, shooting and killing an unarmed bystander who attempts to stop him. Chance recovers, follows Joe into Nathan's personal saloon, and, with help from a penitent Dude, overcomes Nathan's men and arrests Joe for murder.

Chance's friend Pat Wheeler attempts to enter town with a wagon train of supplies and dynamite, but has to force his way through Nathan Burdette's men. Chance reveals that he, Dude (who used to be a deputy before he became a drunk), and his old crippled deputy Stumpy are all that stand between Nathan's small army and Joe, whom they wish to free. Chance notices young gunslinger Colorado Ryan in Wheeler's wagon train, but Colorado promises he doesn't want to start any trouble.

That night, Carlos Robante, the owner of the local hotel, warns Chance that Wheeler is trying to recruit fighters. Chance tries to stop Wheeler, not wanting anyone to get hurt on his account. Wheeler asks if Colorado could help, but Colorado declines, feeling that it's not his fight. Chance then notices a rigged card game at the hotel. Recognizing one of the players as a wanted woman, "Feathers", the widow of a cheating gambler, he confronts her. However, Colorado reveals that another player is the cheater.

Out in the street, Wheeler is gunned down. Chance and Dude pursue the killer into Nathan's saloon, and Chance allows Dude to prove himself and confront the killer, earning the respect of Nathan's men. Colorado and the rest of Wheeler's men are forced to stay in town to await a court order releasing Wheeler's possessions, and the wagons are left behind the Burdette warehouse. After Feathers secretly stays up all night with a shotgun to guard Chance, an irritated Chance orders Feathers to leave town for her safety. She refuses, and the two begin to bond.

Nathan himself rides into town. Stumpy, having old grudges against Nathan for taking his land, threatens to shoot Joe if any trouble starts around the jail. In response, Nathan has his saloon musicians repeatedly play "El Degüello",  "The Cutthroat Song". Colorado realizes the song means Nathan will show no mercy, and warns Chance.

Chance gives Dude back his old guns and some clothes and a black hat he left behind when he became a drunkard, and Dude gets a shave, trying to start afresh. Unfortunately, Stumpy doesn't recognize Dude when he returns, and shoots at him, shattering Dude's nerves. The next day, Dude is still shaky and finds himself ambushed by Burdette's men, who threaten to kill him unless Chance lets Joe go. Colorado and Feathers distract the men long enough for Chance to get his rifle, and he and Colorado shoot down the men and free Dude. Dude thinks about quitting and letting Colorado take his place, but when he hears "El Degüello" being played, he resolves to see the thing through to the end.

Dude and Chance return to the hotel so Dude can take a bath, but Burdette's men capture Carlos' wife Consuelo and use her to lure Chance into a trap. Dude tells Chance to take the men to the jail, under pretext that Stumpy would let Joe out. However, Stumpy opens fire, as Dude secretly predicted. In the chaos, some men drag Dude off to Nathan, who demands a tradeDude for Joe. Chance agrees, but brings Colorado as backup. Dude and Joe brawl during the trade, and a firefight ensues. Stumpy throws some sticks of dynamite from the wagons into the warehouse where Burdette and his men are holed up, and Chance detonates them with his rifle, abruptly ending the fight.

With both Burdettes and their few surviving gunmen in jail, Chance is able to finally spend some time with Feathers and admit his feelings for her. Colorado volunteers to guard the jail, allowing Stumpy and Dude to enjoy a night out in the town.

Cast

 John Wayne as John T. Chance
 Dean Martin as  Dude
 Ricky Nelson as  Colorado Ryan
 Angie Dickinson as  Feathers
 Walter Brennan as  Stumpy
 Ward Bond as  Pat Wheeler
 John Russell as  Nathan Burdette
 Pedro Gonzalez Gonzalez as  Carlos Robante
 Estelita Rodriguez as  Consuela Robante
 Claude Akins as  Joe Burdette
 Bing Russell (Father of actor Kurt Russell) as the cowboy killed by Joe Burdett at the start of the movie. (Uncredited)
 Nesdon Booth as Clark

Malcolm Atterbury and Harry Carey Jr. also receive screen credits in the film's opening, but their scenes were deleted from the final film.

Production

Exteriors for the film were shot at Old Tucson Studios, just outside Tucson. Filming took place in the summer of 1958, and the movie's credits gave 1958 for the copyright; the film was released in March 1959.

Rio Bravo is generally regarded as one of Hawks' best, and is known for its long opening scene which contains no dialogue. The film received favorable reviews, and was successful, taking in over US$5.5 million.

A brief clip from Rio Bravo was among the archive footage later incorporated into the opening sequence of Wayne's last film, The Shootist, to illustrate the backstory of Wayne's character.

As was often the case in a John Wayne Western, Wayne wore his "Red River D" belt buckle in the movie. It can be clearly seen in the scene when Nathan Burdette comes to visit his brother Joe in the jail where he is being held for the U.S. Marshal, about 60 minutes into the film.

The story was credited to "B.H. McCampbell." According to Todd McCarthy's 1997 biography, Howard Hawks: The Grey Fox of Hollywood, this was actually Hawks' eldest daughter, Barbara Hawks McCampbell (McCampbell being her married name). Her contribution was the idea of using dynamite in the final shootout.

Soundtrack

The musical score was composed by Dimitri Tiomkin. His score includes the hauntingly ominous "El Degüello" theme, which is heard several times. The Colorado character identifies the tune as "The Cutthroat Song". He relates that the song was played on the orders of General Antonio López de Santa Anna to the Texans holed up in the Alamo, to signify that no quarter would be given to them. The tune was used in Wayne's film The Alamo (1960). Composer Ennio Morricone recalled that director Sergio Leone asked him to write "Dimitri Tiomkin music" for A Fistful of Dollars. The trumpet theme is similar to Tiomkin's "Degüello" (the Italian title of Rio Bravo was Un dollaro d'onore, A Dollar of Honor).

Because the film starred a crooner, Martin, and a teen idol, Nelson, Hawks included three songs in the soundtrack. Before the big showdown, in the jail house, Martin sings "My Rifle, My Pony, and Me" (which contains new lyrics by Webster to a Tiomkin tune that appeared in Red River), accompanied by Nelson, after which Nelson sings a brief version of "Get Along Home, Cindy", accompanied by Martin and Brennan. Over the closing credits, Martin, backed by the Nelson Riddle Orchestra, sings a specially composed song, "Rio Bravo", written by Tiomkin with lyrics by Paul Francis Webster. Nelson later paid homage to both the film and his character, Colorado, by including the song "Restless Kid" on his 1959 LP, Ricky Sings Again.

Members of the Western Writers of America chose "My Rifle, My Pony, and Me" as one of the Top 100 Western songs of all time.

High Noon debate

The film was made as a response to High Noon, which is sometimes thought to be an allegory for blacklisting in Hollywood, as well as a critique of McCarthyism. Wayne would later call High Noon "un-American" and say he did not regret helping run the writer, Carl Foreman, out of the country. Director Howard Hawks went on the record to criticize High Noon by saying, "I didn't think a good sheriff was going to go running around town like a chicken with his head cut off asking for help, and finally his Quaker wife had to save him." According to film historian Emanuel Levy, Wayne and Hawks teamed up deliberately to rebut High Noon by telling a somewhat similar story their own way: portraying a hero who does not show fear or inner conflict and who never repudiates his commitment to public duty, while only allying himself with capable people, despite offers of help from many other characters. Chance also cites concerns for the safety of those that offer to help and his fears are confirmed when the first such offer results in the character being quickly killed. In Rio Bravo, Chance is surrounded by allies—a deputy who is brave and good with a gun, despite recovering from alcoholism (Dude), a young untried but self-assured gunfighter (Colorado), a limping, crippled old man who is doggedly loyal (Stumpy), a Mexican innkeeper (Carlos), his wife (Consuelo), and an attractive young woman (Feathers)—and repeatedly turns down aid from anyone he does not think is capable of helping him, though in the final shootout they come to help him anyway. "Who'll turn up next?" Wayne asks amid the gunfire, to which Colorado replies: "Maybe the girl with another flower pot."

Reception

In the United Kingdom, Rio Bravo was not originally even reviewed for Sight & Sound; Leslie Halliwell gave the film two out of four stars in his Film Guide, describing it as a "cheerfully overlong and slow-moving Western" that was nevertheless "very watchable for those with time to spare". The film was taken more seriously by British critics such as Robin Wood, who rated it as his top film of all time and wrote a book on it in 2003 for the British Film Institute, publishers of Sight & Sound. Pauline Kael called the film "silly, but with zest; there are some fine action sequences, and the performers seem to be enjoying their roles." Rio Bravo was the second highest-ranking Western (63rd overall) in the 2012 Sight & Sound critics' poll of the greatest films ever made. In 2008, the American Film Institute nominated this film for its Top 10 Western Films list.

Director Quentin Tarantino called Rio Bravo his "favorite 'hangout' movie". He once said that if his date doesn't like the film, there will be no relationship.

Legacy
Howard Hawks went on to direct two loose variations of Rio Bravo with the idea of a sheriff defending his office against belligerent outlaws. John Wayne starred in both films, released as El Dorado in 1966 with Robert Mitchum playing a variation of Dean Martin's original role, and Rio Lobo in 1970.

The 1976 film Assault on Precinct 13 directed by John Carpenter was inspired by the story and setting of Rio Bravo.

Music
 "My Rifle, My Pony and Me"—sung by Dean Martin and Ricky Nelson
 "Cindy"—sung by Ricky Nelson, Dean Martin and Walter Brennan
 "Rio Bravo"—sung by Dean Martin (end credits)

Comic book adaption
 Dell Four Color #1018 (June 1959)

See also
 List of American films of 1959
 John Wayne filmography

References

Further reading

External links

 Rio Bravo Essay by Michael Schlesinger at National Film Registry
 
 
 
 
 

1959 films
1959 Western (genre) films
American Western (genre) films
American buddy films
1950s English-language films
Films scored by Dimitri Tiomkin
Films about alcoholism
Films directed by Howard Hawks
Films set in Texas
Films shot in Tucson, Arizona
Films shot in California
Films with screenplays by Leigh Brackett
Warner Bros. films
United States National Film Registry films
Films with screenplays by Jules Furthman
Siege films
Films adapted into comics
1950s American films